Dmosin  is a village in Brzeziny County, Łódź Voivodeship, in central Poland. It is the seat of the gmina (administrative district) called Gmina Dmosin. It consists of three sołectwos: Dmosin, Dmosin Pierwszy ("first Dmosin") and Dmosin Drugi ("second Dmosin").

The village has an approximate population of 1,500.

References

Dmosin
Piotrków Governorate
Łódź Voivodeship (1919–1939)